Cryptophasa epixysta is a moth in the family Xyloryctidae. It was described by Turner in 1917. It is found in Australia, where it has been recorded from the Northern Territory.

The wingspan is 52–56 mm. The forewings are shining white and the hindwings are white.

References

Cryptophasa
Moths described in 1917